Timothy Taban Juch (also spelled Timothy Taban Juc) is a South Sudanese politician and the former governor of Akobo State in South Sudan.

Taban was the Jonglei State Minister for Information & Communication, and was appointed the commissioner of Akobo County in 2014. Taban then became the deputy governor of Eastern Bieh State, and was appointed governor of Akobo State on August 19, 2019 after the death of Johnson Gony Bilieu on July 4, 2019. Taban appointed his cabinet on September 25, 2019. During his time as governor, severe floods in the state led to food insecurity and caused some residents to flee to Bieh State.

References 

South Sudanese politicians
Living people
Year of birth missing (living people)